Ripely Pine is the debut studio album by American musician Lady Lamb. It was released on February 19, 2013, under Ba Da Bing Records.

Track listing

Personnel

Main musicians
 Aly Spaltro – vocals, guitar, bass, banjo, autoharp, omnichord, percussion
 Henry Jamison – bass, backing vocals
 Peter McLaughlin – drums, backing vocals

Production
 Nadim Issa – engineer, mixing, producer
 Drew Guido – assistant engineer
 Joe LaPorta – mastering
 Aly Spaltro – artwork, layout
 Shervin Lainez – photography

Additional musicians
 Walker Adams – drums (track 2)
 Alex Asher – trombone (tracks 1, 2, 6, 7)
 Jeff Beam – backing vocals (track 11)
 Erin 'Dilly Dilly' Davidson – backing vocals (tracks 8, 11)
 Maisie Degoosh – backing vocals (track 11)
 Kaitlynn Gatchell – backing vocals (track 11)
 Drew Guido – melodica (tracks 4) – sythn (tracks 11)
 Wesley Hartley – backing vocals (track 11)
 Emily Hope Price – cello (tracks 7, 10)
 Maria Im – violin (tracks 4, 7)
 Nadim Issa – piano, organ, rhodes, keys, drums (tracks 7, 12), melodica (track 5)
 Maria Jeffers – cello (track 6)
 Cole Kamen-Green – trumpet (track 2)
 Nora Krohn – viola (track 6)
 TJ Metcalf – backing vocals (track 11)
 Brooke Quiggins – violin (track 6)
 Ben Strapp – tuba (tracks 7, 9)
 Elizabeth Taillon – backing vocals (track 11)
 Hannah Tarkison – backing vocals (track 11)
 Melissa Tong – violin (track 6)

References

External links

2013 debut albums
Lady Lamb albums
Ba Da Bing Records albums